Red House Farm is a residential area of Newcastle upon Tyne, about  north west of the city centre.  It is bordered by Fawdon to the south and North Gosforth to the north.  It is a small residential area of primarily semi-detached houses and flats.  It is also home to some small independent retailers and The Northumbrian Piper restaurant and pub. The Red House Farm area is served by a number of local bus routes.

Districts of Newcastle upon Tyne